PZH may refer to:

IATA code for Zhob Airport
Plateelbakkerij Zuid-Holland, a pottery maker in Regina (pottery)
Narodowy Instytut Zdrowia Publicznego – Państwowy Zakład Higieny, a research institute in Poland